Condurache is a Romanian surname. Notable people with the surname include:

Dan Condurache (born 1952), Romanian actor
Roxana Condurache (born 1987), Romanian actress

Romanian-language surnames